Spring Integration is an open source framework for enterprise application integration. It is a  framework that builds upon the core Spring framework.

Spring Integration is part of the Spring portfolio.

See also
Spring Framework
Apache Camel - similar solution

References

External links 
 

Java enterprise platform